Maria Barros may refer to:
 Maria Barros (fashion designer) (born 1980), Spanish fashion designer
 Maria Lorena Barros (1948–1976), Filipino women's rights activist
 Maria Victoria Barros (born 1992), Brazilian politician and businesswoman